Justin James Michael Wolfers, born in 1972, is an Australian economist and public policy scholar. He is professor of economics and public policy at the Gerald R. Ford School of Public Policy at the University of Michigan, and a Senior Fellow at the Peterson Institute for International Economics.

Career 
Wolfers holds a Ph.D. in Economics (1997–2001) and an Master of Economics (2000), both from Harvard University, and a Bachelor of Economics from the University of Sydney (1991–1994). He had a Fulbright Scholarship. Wolfers attended James Ruse Agricultural High School (1985–1990). He is noted for his research on happiness and its relation to income.

Wolfers moved to the University of Michigan as professor of economics and public policy beginning in fall 2012 with his partner, fellow economist Betsey Stevenson. Prior to coming to the University of Michigan, Wolfers was associate professor of business and public policy at the Wharton School of the University of Pennsylvania. He is a contributor to the New York Times (where he writes for The Upshot blog) and the Wall Street Journal, and was an editor of the Brookings Papers on Economic Activity from 2009 through Fall 2015. Wolfers' research has explored macro economics, labor economics,  the economics of sports,  prediction markets and the family.

In 2007, he was named in David Leonhardt's column as one of 13 young economists who were the future of economics. In 2014, he was named by International Monetary Fund as one of the 25 brightest young economists who are expected to shape the world's thinking about the global economy in the future.

In 2019, he and Stevenson wrote two economics textbooks, Principles of Microeconomics and Principles of Macroeconomics, published by Macmillan Learning. The authors' aim was to reflect a school of thought where "every decision a person makes as an economic decision" and offer examples students could relate to in order to better reflect the real world.

Personal life 
Wolfers and Betsey Stevenson have publicly discussed being in a Shared Earning/Shared Parenting relationship.

References

Australian economists
Living people
1972 births
University of Sydney alumni
Harvard Graduate School of Arts and Sciences alumni
University of Michigan faculty
People educated at James Ruse Agricultural High School